Alimi is a surname. Notable people with the surname include:

Armend Alimi (born 1987), Macedonian footballer
Bisi Alimi (born 1975), Nigerian activist
Isnik Alimi (born 1994), Albanian footballer
Jamiu Alimi (born 1992), Nigerian footballer
Sikuru Alimi (born 1942), Nigerian boxer